The State House (formerly Government House) is the official residence and office of the president of Barbados. It was built in 1702 during the colonial days and served as a Quaker Plantation, until it was purchased by the imperial government, to act as a replacement to the Bagatelle Great House in the Parish of St Thomas.

From then, it served as the residence of the governor of Barbados. It later continued in the role of official residence and office of the governor-general of Barbados following independence from the United Kingdom in 1966. Upon the abolition of the monarchy on 30 November 2021, Government House was renamed State House and has effectively become the official residence of the president of Barbados.

See also

Ilaro Court, the official residence of the Prime Minister of Barbados
Government Houses of the British Empire
Governors-General of Barbados
List of Governors of Barbados
President of Barbados
Monarchy of Barbados

References

Official residences in Barbados
Government buildings in Barbados
Government Houses of the British Empire and Commonwealth
British colonial architecture
Presidential residences